The 2007–08 SEB Korvpalli Meistriliiga is the 17th season of the Estonian basketball league and the fourth under the title sponsorship of SEB. Including the competition's previous incarnations, this is the 83rd season of the Estonian men's basketball league. TÜ/Rock came into the season as defending champions of the 2006–07 KML season.

The season started on 3 October 2007 and concluded on 21 May 2008 with TÜ/Rock defeating Tallinna Kalev/Cramo 4 games to 0 in the 2008 KML Finals to win their 24th Estonian League title.

Regular season

League table

Updated to match(es) played on 21 May 2008. Source: KML (2007/2008)

Playoffs
The playoffs began on 18 April 2008 and ended on 21 May 2008. The tournament concluded with TÜ/Rock defeating Tallinna Kalev/Cramo 4 games to 0 in the 2008 KML Finals.

Bracket

External links
 Korvpalli Meistriliiga

References

Korvpalli Meistriliiga seasons
Estonian
KML